Vasilyevka is a rural locality (a selo) in Partizansky Selsoviet, Meleuzovsky District, Bashkortostan, Russia. The population was 290 as of 2010. There are 6 streets.

Geography 
Vasilyevka is located 21 km north of Meleuz (the district's administrative centre) by road. Ivanovka is the nearest rural locality.

References 

Rural localities in Meleuzovsky District